Amós Salvador Rodrigáñez (March 31, 1845 – September 4, 1922) was a Spanish politician and engineer.

Economy and finance ministers of Spain
Education ministers of Spain
1845 births
1922 deaths
Governors of the Bank of Spain